Houston County High School is the name of several schools:

Houston County High School (Alabama), Columbia, Alabama
Houston County High School (Georgia), Warner Robins, Georgia
Houston County High School (Tennessee), Erin, Tennessee